Hercules: The Legendary Journeys is an American television series filmed in New Zealand, based on the tales of the classical Greek culture hero Heracles (Hercules was his Roman analogue). Starring Kevin Sorbo as Hercules and Michael Hurst as Iolaus, it was produced from January 16, 1995, to November 22, 1999. It ran for six seasons, producing action figures and other memorabilia as it became one of the highest-rated syndicated television shows in the world at that time. It has aired on Once Channel, Sky1, five/5, Heroes & Icons, and Horror.

It was preceded by several TV movies with the same major characters in 1994 as part of Universal Media Studios's Action Pack in order of appearance: Hercules and the Amazon Women, Hercules and the Lost Kingdom, Hercules and the Circle of Fire, Hercules in the Underworld, and Hercules in the Maze of the Minotaur, the last of which served mostly as a "clip show" of the previous movies as a lead up to the series. The show was cancelled midway through filming of the sixth season, and only a total of eight episodes were produced after Sorbo initially declined to renew a three-year extension contract to continue his role as Hercules.

Plot

The series is set in a fantasy version of ancient Greece not precisely located in historical time. The show also has a mixture of Oriental, Egyptian and Medieval elements in various episodes. The show stars Kevin Sorbo as Hercules and regularly features Michael Hurst as his sidekick Iolaus. Rotating as Hercules' other regular companion, particularly in earlier seasons, is Salmoneus (Robert Trebor), a wheeler-dealer ever looking to make a quick drachma.

Typical plot lines involve Hercules and Iolaus saving rustic villagers from monsters, evil warlords, or the often selfish whims of the gods. There was also comedy and episodes often had "in-jokes" about modern themes.

In the earlier episodes as mentioned in the show's opening title, Hercules' main nemesis is his evil stepmother Hera, the powerful queen of the gods who seeks to destroy Hercules using various monsters and helping her various followers because he is a reminder of her husband Zeus' infidelity. As the series progressed, a wider range of enemies was used; notably Hercules' half-brother, the malicious god of war Ares replaced Hera as the show's primary antagonist. Towards the end of the series, Ares is himself replaced by the evil god Dahak who is the main villain in the show's fifth season and sets off a story arc that has Hercules traveling to Sumeria, Norseland and Éire. Although Zeus, Hercules' father, is frequently cited by Hercules as a neglectful father, Zeus' love for Hercules is well documented in the show. Indeed, Hercules is often referred to as "the favorite son of Zeus". Zeus makes several appearances on the show, even saving his son's life and restoring his superhuman strength on one occasion when he needs it the most. Hercules, for his own part, is always there for Zeus when his father needs him, and in the end, Hercules reconciles with his father and buries whatever issues he has with the father he has come to understand and love.

Cast

Main cast

 Hercules (Kevin Sorbo)
 Iolaus (Michael Hurst)

Recurring cast

 Alcmene (Elizabeth Hawthorne, Liddy Holloway, Kim Michalis)
 Aphrodite (Alexandra Tydings)
 Apollo (Scott Michaelson)
 Ares (Kevin Smith)
 Artemis (Rhonda McHardy)
 Atalanta (Cory Everson)
 Autolycus (Bruce Campbell)
 Callisto (Hudson Leick)
 Cassandra (Claudia Black)
 Charon (Michael Hurst)
 Cupid (Karl Urban)
 Dahak (Michael Hurst, Mark Newnham)
 Deianeira (Tawny Kitaen)
 Deimos (Joel Tobeck)
 Dirce (Lisa Chappell)
 Discord (Meighan Desmond)
 Falafel (Paul Norell)
 Gabrielle (Renee O'Connor)
 Hades (Erik Thomson, Mark Ferguson)
 Hera (Meg Foster)
 Iphicles (Kevin Smith)
 Jason (Jeffrey Thomas, Chris Conrad)
 Joxer (Ted Raimi)
 Kernunnos (Stuart Devenie)
 Morrígan (Tamara Gorski)
 Nebula (Gina Torres)
 Nemesis (Karen Witter, Teresa Hill, Kimberley Joseph)
 Odin (Peter McCauley)
 Persephone (Andrea Croton)
 Salmoneus (Robert Trebor)
 Serena (Sam Jenkins, Kara Zediker)
 Strife (Joel Tobeck)
 Xena (Lucy Lawless)
 Zeus (Roy Dotrice, Peter Vere-Jones, Charles Keating, Anthony Quinn).

Episodes

Spin-offs
The show had two spin-offs, Xena: Warrior Princess and Young Hercules, with which it shared recurring characters such as Ares (Kevin Smith), Autolycus (Bruce Campbell), Salmoneus (Robert Trebor), Aphrodite (Alexandra Tydings), Deimos/Strife (Joel Tobeck) and Callisto (Hudson Leick). Both shows, although produced in New Zealand with mostly local actors using American accents, were syndicated worldwide.

Home media
Anchor Bay Entertainment released all six seasons of Hercules: The Legendary Journeys on DVD in Region 1 for the first time between 2003 and 2005. As of 2010, these releases have now been discontinued.

On January 12, 2010, Universal Studios Home Entertainment announced that they planned on re-releasing Hercules: The Legendary Journeys on DVD. They have subsequently re-released all six seasons.

In Region 4, Madman Entertainment has released all six seasons on DVD in Australia.

 NOTE: The Season 1 release in both regions 1 & 4 includes the 5 tele-films preceding the series. The region 1 re-release does not include the TV movies.

In other media

Video game

Hercules: The Legendary Journeys is an action adventure video game with beat 'em up elements that was released on the Nintendo 64 and Game Boy Color, developed by Player 1 and published by Titus Interactive, based on the television series.

Animation
Hercules and Xena – The Animated Movie: The Battle for Mount Olympus is a 1998 American animated action-adventure direct-to-video film starring the voices of Kevin Sorbo, Lucy Lawless, Michael Hurst, Renee O'Connor, Kevin Smith, and Alexandra Tydings, all reprising their roles from Hercules: The Legendary Journeys and Xena: Warrior Princess. It was directed by Lynne Naylor and written by John Loy. It later received a television airing on Fox's Fox Kids block. The movie's plot involved Hercules and Xena joining forces to save the Gods of Olympus from the Titans.

Legacy
The success of the show led to the commissioning of several similar series, also set in the ancient world, including The Adventures of Sinbad, Conan the Adventurer, The New Adventures of Robin Hood, BeastMaster, Tarzan: The Epic Adventures, and Jack of All Trades. A sci-fi series, Cleopatra 2525, was also produced as a result of the series' influence. Thirteen years later, Legend of the Seeker was produced by the same team.

See also
 List of Hercules and Xena characters
 Greek mythology in popular culture
 Hercules in popular culture

References

External links

 

 
1990s American drama television series
1990s New Zealand television series
1995 American television series debuts
1999 American television series endings
1995 New Zealand television series debuts
1999 New Zealand television series endings
Action Pack (TV programming block)
American action adventure television series
American fantasy drama television series
American fantasy television series
Depictions of Julius Caesar on television
English-language television shows
First-run syndicated television programs in the United States
New Zealand drama television series
New Zealand science fiction television series
Television shows filmed in New Zealand
Television series by Universal Television
Television series set in ancient history
Television series about Heracles
Television shows set in Greece
Works by Alex Kurtzman and Roberto Orci
Classical mythology in popular culture
Television shows adapted into films
Television shows adapted into comics
Television shows adapted into video games
Television series set in ancient Greece
Television series based on classical mythology
Television series created by Sam Raimi
Video games based on Greek mythology